Raglesville is an unincorporated community and census-designated place (CDP) in Van Buren Township, Daviess County, Indiana, United States. As of the 2010 census it had a population of 141.

History
Raglesville was laid out in 1837. A post office was established at Raglesville in 1849, and remained in operation until it was discontinued in 1923. John Ragle was the first postmaster.

Geography

Demographics

References

Census-designated places in Daviess County, Indiana
Census-designated places in Indiana